Darrell Lee Waltrip (born February 5, 1947) is an American motorsports analyst, author, former national television broadcaster, and stock car driver. He raced from 1972 to 2000 in the NASCAR Cup Series (known as the NASCAR Winston Cup Series during his time as a driver), most notably driving the No. 17 Chevrolet for Hendrick Motorsports. Waltrip is a three-time Cup Series champion (1981, 1982, 1985).

Posting a modern NASCAR series record of 22 top five finishes in 1983 and 21 top five finishes both in 1981 and 1986, Waltrip won 84 NASCAR Cup Series races, including the 1989 Daytona 500, a record five in the Coca-Cola 600 (formerly the World 600) (1978, 1979, 1985, 1988, 1989), and a track and Series record for any driver at Bristol Motor Speedway with 12 (seven consecutive from 1981 to 1984). Those victories tie him with Bobby Allison for fourth on the NASCAR's all-time wins list in the Cup Series and place him second to Jeff Gordon for the most wins in NASCAR's modern era. He is ranked fifth for all-time pole positions with 59, including all-time modern era highs with 35 on short tracks and eight on road courses. Competing in 809 Cup starts over four decades and 29 years (1972–2000), he has scored 271 Top 5s and 390 Top 10s. Winning nearly $19.9 million in posted earnings, he became the first NASCAR driver to be awarded over $10 million in race winnings.

Waltrip has additionally won 13 NASCAR Busch Grand National Series races, seven American Speed Association (ASA) races, three IROC races, two Automobile Racing Club of America (ARCA) races, two NASCAR All-American Challenge Series events, two All Pro Racing Association races, and a USAC race. He competed in the 24 Hours of Daytona. He also holds the all-time track record 67 wins at the Fairgrounds Speedway in Nashville, Tennessee, including NASCAR, USAC, ASA, and local Late Model Sportsman NASCAR sanctioned series races. He still holds many NASCAR records, more than two decades after his retirement as an active driver.

He has also won many awards in NASCAR. That includes two for NASCAR's Most Popular Driver Award (1989, 1990), three for "American Driver of the Year" (1979, 1981, 1982), and "NASCAR's Driver of the Decade" for the 1980s, as well as three for "National Motorsports Press Association Driver of the Year" (1977, 1981, and 1982), two for "Auto Racing Digest Driver of the Year" (1981 and 1982), the first "Tennessee Professional Athlete of the Year" (1979), one of NASCAR's 50 Greatest Drivers in 1998, and the Bill France "Award of Excellence" in 2000. He has been inducted into numerous halls of fame, including the Motorsports Hall of Fame of America for 2003 the International Motorsports Hall of Fame for 2005. After being nominated for the inaugural 2010 and 2011 classes, he was inducted into the NASCAR Hall of Fame's 2012 class.

Waltrip served as a color analyst for Fox Sports alongside Mike Joy, and Jeff Gordon, a columnist at Foxsports.com, and an author. He is the older brother of former NASCAR driver and the now defunct MWR team owner Michael Waltrip. Waltrip retired from the commentary box at the conclusion of Fox's broadcast schedule for the 2019 NASCAR season in June 2019.

Early years

Waltrip was born on February 5, 1947, in Owensboro, Kentucky. Starting his driving career in Go-karts at age 12, Waltrip entered his first stock car race just four years later. Waltrip and his father built a 1936 Chevrolet coupe and headed to a local dirt track near their Owensboro home. The first night out was far from a success as the youngster, barely old enough to drive on the street, slammed the wall and heavily damaged the coupe. Waltrip soon left the dirt and found his niche on asphalt where the smoothness he learned in the karts proved a valuable asset. Waltrip was a 1965 graduate of Daviess County High School in Owensboro.

He was an early racer at the Kentucky Motor Speedway (an asphalt track in Whitesville) and Ellis Raceway, a dirt track on US Highway 60 west in Daviess County (Ellis Raceway is now closed), driving a car called "Big 100" built by Harry Pedley, owner of Pedley's Garage, on West Second Street, in Owensboro and sponsored by R.C. Bratcher Radiator and Welding Co. His success gained the attention of Nashville owner/driver P. B. Crowell, who urged Waltrip to move to the area to race at the Fairgrounds Speedway, at the Tennessee State Fairgrounds in Nashville, where he would win two track championships, in 1970, and 1973.

Waltrip drove the No. 48 P. B. Crowell owned Ford sponsored by American Home, in Nashville, where he aggressively promoted the week's race when he appeared on a local television program promoting the speedway's races, and was not afraid to embrace the local media when other competitors were reluctant to do so. Some of the notorious "on air" trash-talking included making fun of some of the other local drivers such as Coo Coo Marlin (whose son Sterling later raced at the circuit and is a two-time Daytona 500 winner) and James "Flookie" Buford, whose nickname he would mock on air. It pleased track management that he was helping sell tickets, leading to packed grandstands and extra paychecks from track operators for his promotional skills.

He became friends with WSM radio host Ralph Emery in his early years, forming a bond which would be influential throughout his career, as Waltrip would appear frequently on Emery's early morning television show on local Nashville television station, WSMV, and later substitute for Emery in the 1980s on Emery's television show, Nashville Now on the former TNN cable network (later, Spike TV). Waltrip would use the success he enjoyed at the Music City Motorplex, and his notoriety and public speaking skills that he acquired from television appearances in Nashville, as a springboard into NASCAR's big leagues.

He became a Christian in 1983 but it was years later before God came first in his life.  One of the charities he supports is the Motor Racing Outreach (MRO) providing spiritual support to racers and their families.

NASCAR career

Early years in NASCAR: 1972–1975
Waltrip started in NASCAR Winston Cup Series (Winston Cup), NASCAR's top racing series at age 25, (25 years, 3 months, 2 days), on May 7, 1972, at the 1972 Winston 500, at Talladega, Alabama, the series' fastest and longest track at 2.66 miles, (4.281 kilometers), driving a 1969 Mercury Cyclone he purchased from Holman-Moody, originally the Ford Fairlane driven by Mario Andretti to victory in the 1967 Daytona 500. Waltrip finished 38th in his first Winston Cup race after retiring on lap 69 due to engine failure. Waltrip paid $12,500 for the car, a spare engine and some spare parts and drove it in 5 cup series events until mid-1973. The car was converted from the Ford Fairlane Andretti drove, to a 1969 Mercury Cyclone as driven by Waltrip, and later converted to a 1971 Mercury Cyclone. The car was sponsored by Terminal Transport of Owensboro, Kentucky, Waltrip's first major sponsor. Waltrip still owns the car today as part of a collection of cars he has raced and is one of his favorites.

The early years found Waltrip competing against legendary stock car racers such as Richard Petty, David Pearson, Cale Yarborough, and Bobby Allison, among others. Waltrip soon earned the respect of his more experienced peers. He was given the No. 95 as a number but Waltrip preferred car No. 17 because his hero, David Pearson, had success with the number in earlier years. As an owner/driver, Waltrip ran 5 races in 1972, 14 races in 1973, 16 races in 1974, with 7 top-five finishes, and 17 races as an owner/driver in 1975, with his first Winston Cup victory coming at his home track, May 10, 1975, at age 28, (28 years, 3 months, 5 days), in the Music City 420, outpacing the field by two laps at the track where he had won 2 track championships in Nashville, Tennessee, in the No. 17 Terminal Transport Chevrolet, a car Waltrip owned.

During the 1973 season, Waltrip drove 5 Winston Cup races for Bud Moore Engineering.

DiGard years: 1975–1980

Except for five races in 1973, driving for Bud Moore Engineering, Waltrip primarily drove his own cars from the beginning of his NASCAR career until the middle of the 1975 NASCAR Winston Cup Series (Winston Cup) season, when he was signed to a multi-year contract and replaced driver Donnie Allison to drive the No. 88 DiGard Chevrolet, Waltrip's long-awaited jump into the big leagues of United States stock car auto racing. The DiGard racing team was founded in part by Mike DiProspero and Bill Gardner, who were brothers-in-law, with the legendary Robert Yates as engine builder.

Waltrip's first race with DiGard came on August 17, 1975, at the Talladega 500, Talladega Superspeedway, in Talladega, Alabama, finishing 42nd after experiencing engine failure. Waltrip would compete in ten more races in the 1975 season for DiGard, sponsored by Terminal Transport, and get his second career Winston Cup victory October 12, 1975, in the Capital City 500, in Richmond, Virginia. He would post three top-five and four top-ten finishes in the 11 races he ran for DiGard in 1975.

During the late 1970s, Waltrip would begin his domination of NASCAR's short track venues, especially at the Bristol International Speedway (Bristol, Tennessee), Martinsville Speedway (Martinsville, Virginia) and the Music City Motorplex (Nashville). He holds the track record at Bristol International Speedway, for wins with 12 victories, and for pole positions at Martinsville Speedway, with 8 pole position awards.

In 1976, Gatorade became Waltrip's primary sponsor as he started his first full race season at age 29, driving the DiGard Gatorade Chevrolet. Waltrip won only one Winston Cup race in 1976, the Virginia 500, at Martinsville Speedway in Ridgeway, Virginia, but in 1977 and 1978, working with legendary NASCAR crew chief Buddy Parrott, he won six times each year, including his first of four career victories at the Talladega Superspeedway, in Talladega, AL, on May 1, 1977, and his first of a five career victories in the series' longest race, a grueling 600 mile race, the Coca-Cola 600 (formerly the World 600), May 28, 1978. Waltrip, and Parrott, would win 21 NASCAR races together from 1977 through 1980.

In perhaps the most famous and most well known NASCAR race, the 1979 Daytona 500, held February 18, 1979, a race that Richard Petty won, Waltrip was a pre-race favorite to win the race. As the first NASCAR race covered "flag to flag" on national television, Cale Yarborough, and Donnie Allison, while battling for the lead on the last lap, came together and crashed hard, taking each other out, in the third turn. While the Allison and Yarborough cars were spinning and coming to rest in the grassy infield, attention turned quickly to the new leaders, Richard Petty running third, and Waltrip, running closely behind in fourth, as a fist fight ensued between Yarborough, Donnie Allison, and his brother and racer, Bobby Allison, in the turn three grass. Earlier in the race, Waltrip's DiGard Gatorade Oldsmobile, dropped a cylinder and while able to hang onto the slipstream of the Petty car on the final lap, was not able to draft past the Petty car in the fourth turn on the final lap due to the reduction in horsepower. Still, Waltrip finished runner-up in perhaps the most famous race in NASCAR history, and was an early turning point in Waltrip's career.

The 1979 Daytona 500 would be an early season precursor for the remaining nine months of the racing season. Waltrip and Petty would engage in a bitter battle, race after race, for the 1979 NASCAR championship. In that 1979 season, Waltrip won seven Winston Cup races and was a serious contender for what would have been his first championship despite numerous engine failures, mechanical problems, and differences with DiGard management. On September 23, 1979, after winning pole position and leading 184 laps at the Old Dominion 500, at Martinsville, Virginia, Waltrip again experienced engine failure. The DiGard team pitted the car and made a rare mid-race engine change in a record 11 minutes. Waltrip lost 29 laps in the pits but was able to finish 11th, as Petty finished 2nd.

At the start of the final race of the season, the Los Angeles Times 500, at Ontario Motor Speedway, Ontario, California, Waltrip led Richard Petty by a scant 2 points in the year-long championship battle after finishing the race 5th ahead of Petty's 6th-place finish in the previous race, the Dixie 500, Atlanta Motor Speedway, November 4, 1979. However, Petty won an unprecedented seventh, and his final, NASCAR Cup Series championship by finishing the final race of the season in 5th position, as Waltrip finished 8th. The final margin of Petty's championship victory over Waltrip was only 11 points, the third-closest points race in NASCAR Cup Series history.

Waltrip closed out the 1970s driving the No. 88 DiGard Chevrolet, sponsored by Gatorade, ranked NASCAR's No. 2 driver, having won 22 Winston Cup races in just 149 race starts. His aggressive driving style and outspoken demeanor earned him the nickname "Jaws", a reference to the 1975 film about a killer shark. The nickname was given to Waltrip by rival Cale Yarborough in an interview after Waltrip crashed Yarborough and D.K. Ulrich out of the 1977 Southern 500. Ulrich assumed that Yarborough had caused the wreck and questioned him after the race, to which Yarborough famously responded, "That Jaws ran into you." Waltrip himself preferred the nicknames "D.W." or "D-Dubya" but he acknowledged Yarborough by displaying an inflatable toy shark in his pit at the next race.

At the height of his NASCAR Cup Series success in the early 1980s, fans often booed Waltrip, in large part because of his success on the track defeating more established drivers with large fan followings, but also because of his open criticism of NASCAR, his admitting to condoning cheating, and his aggressive "take no prisoners", "win at all costs" approach to driving. Doing him no favors was his widely-publicized falling-out with DiGard leadership, where he publicly admitted that he would not have won a championship as long as he drove for them. He attempted several times to be released from his driving contract with DiGard in 1980, a year in which Waltrip won five Winston Cup races. Still, Waltrip had a huge and devoted fan following. It was often said by race commentators and sports columnists that "you either hate him or love him".

It was Waltrip's rival Cale Yarborough, driver for legendary owner Junior Johnson, that privately told Waltrip that he intended to cut back on his racing appearances and leave Junior Johnson & Associates team at the end of the 1980 season, opening the position for Waltrip, but only if Waltrip could successfully negotiate an early termination of his contract with DiGard. Waltrip successfully negotiated his exit from DiGard, and would take over the No. 11 for 1981.

Junior Johnson years: 1981–1986

Waltrip's success driving the Junior Johnson prepared cars came immediately and even surpassed the highly successful years he had with DiGard. In his first two years as driver for the Mountain Dew sponsored Buick Regal, Waltrip won 12 races each year, and his first two NASCAR Winston Cup Series (Winston Cup) championships, in 1981 and 1982. Waltrip's success and driving prowess helped to bring the Buick Grand National into prominence. The company later honored the Waltrip years with throwback paint schemes, once in 2006 and again in 2008.

It was during the early 1980s, with Junior Johnson, that Waltrip first worked with Jeff Hammond, a pit crewman for Johnson. Hammond was at first skeptical of Waltrip's driving style since it differed so much from the former driver for whom he worked, Cale Yarborough. Yarborough made adjustments to his driving based on the handling of the car in a particular race whereas Waltrip wanted the car adjusted around his driving style. Hammond eventually came to appreciate Waltrip's "finesse", and smooth driving style which proved highly successful. Waltrip and Hammond would benefit from each other's knowledge and abilities and would work together for most of their careers in the sport. Waltrip and Hammond work together, even today, as broadcaster and analyst at Fox Sports, and Speed TV.

Waltrip's first season with Junior Johnson was a huge success. He won 12 races including big races such as the Rebel 500, the Food City 500, and the Riverside 400 event. He almost swept Talladega for his 1981 season by nearly winning the Talladega 500. On the final lap rookie Ron Bouchard dove under Waltrip and Terry Labonte to take the lead. Bouchard beat Waltrip by a foot in a 3-wide drag race in what has been called the biggest upset in NASCAR history. Waltrip reportedly said "Where the hell did he come from?" in an interview. Waltrip also stated in a post-race conference that part of the reason he lost the race was because he thought Bouchard was a lap down and therefore did not block Bouchard.

He ended 1981 with 11 poles, 12 wins, 21 top fives, and 25 top tens.  Not only did Waltrip win 12 races, he also won the Winston Cup championship over nemesis Bobby Allison, rallying from a nearly 300-point deficit in midsummer and taking the points lead for keeps with a second place finish at Dover in September. Waltrip then strung together four consecutive victories and ran well in the final two races of the season to win by 53 points.

In 1982, Waltrip again won 12 races and basically repeated his 1981 season. He claimed his second championship in a row that year, again scratching and clawing his way past Bobby Allison with a late-season charge, taking the lead at Martinsville in October, and winning the title by 72 points.

At the 1983 Daytona 500 on February 20, 1983, Waltrip, a pre-race favorite to win the race, drove the Chevrolet Monte Carlo SS Pepsi Challenger. Waltrip locked his brakes but the car slid for several hundred feet, then struck an earthen embankment near the entrance to pit road. The force of the impact was so violent that Waltrip's car was thrown back onto the track, in front of oncoming traffic. Waltrip then made hard contact with the outside concrete retaining wall once again into oncoming traffic. Cale Yarborough, the eventual winner of the race, barely avoided hitting the demolished Pepsi Challenger. Waltrip suffered a concussion and was taken by ambulance to the Halifax Medical Center for observation and medical treatment. The crash was a wake-up call and a life-changing event for Waltrip. When he heard drivers and fans joking that the crash would "knock him conscious" or "finally shut him up", he realized for the first time how unpopular he was and resolved to clean up his image. The years following that crash would see a different Darrell Waltrip, one who worked hard to repair and rebuild his relationship with fans and fellow drivers. Years later, Waltrip would be voted (by NASCAR fans) "Most Popular Driver", two years in a row, (1989, 1990).

Waltrip would continue his unprecedented success driving for Junior Johnson through the 1986 season, winning his third and final Winston Cup championship, in 1985, winning the inaugural All-Star race, The Winston, in 1985, and compiling 43 total wins with the team.

Waltrip was quick to recognize the new and rapid expansion of the sport's popularity among teens and young adults and others never before considered NASCAR fans. The growth was primarily due to increasing national network and cable subscription television which televised almost every NASCAR event live, and the growing interest of new family oriented sponsors never before associated with motorsports. NASCAR was becoming a multi-regional sport enjoyed by men, women and children alike. In addition to the huge influx of money from new sponsors and television, the more astute NASCAR team owners immediately embraced new resources such as computers, telemetry, research and development, multi-car teams for information sharing, wind-tunnel testing, and engineering. Waltrip, now one of two drivers for Johnson, was quick to envision the future of NASCAR and sought to take advantage of the coming changes something his car owner, Junior Johnson a pioneer of the sport, was somewhat reluctant to embrace. Johnson and his team had enjoyed success for decades and won numerous races and championships spanning decades using his own formulas for success.

Well aware of Junior Johnson's long-standing steadfast rule of never discussing an adjustment to a driver's contractual salary, and never really comfortable with the allocation of resources that Johnson's two car team required, Waltrip approached Johnson about an increase in his contract salary. Although the story as told by Waltrip is most likely folklore, Waltrip drove his final race for Junior Johnson on November 16, 1986, in a Chevrolet sponsored by Budweiser finishing 4th at that year's Winston Western 500 at Riverside International Raceway, completing one of the most successful owner/driver partnerships in all of motorsports history. Waltrip and Johnson remained close friends and respected each other as pioneers and champions of the sport.

Hendrick Motorsports years: 1987–1990

Waltrip's partnership with car owner Junior Johnson led to huge success with three NASCAR Winston Cup Series (Winston Cup) championships and 43 Winston Cup wins. The connection between fast cars and alcohol consumption became a concern for him. He began to seek other opportunities after a conversation with his friend and pastor Cortez Cooper. Johnson had signed Budweiser to be his team's primary sponsor in 1984, which unintentionally made Waltrip one of the faces of the connection he was so concerned about.

Years before, Waltrip had opened a Honda dealership in his home town of Franklin, Tennessee, with the help of his friend, Rick Hendrick, owner of Hendrick Motorsports. During the 1986 season, Waltrip and Hendrick discussed the possibility of Waltrip joining the Hendrick organization, which fielded cars for Geoff Bodine and Tim Richmond and the two discussed the potential of Waltrip moving to a new team. Waltrip was still under contract with Johnson for the 1986 season, but following the year he was able to break the contract in a unique way. As he recounted in an interview for the Fox Sports Net series Beyond the Glory in 2001, Waltrip gained his release by purposely breaking one of Johnson's cardinal rules: asking for a raise (Johnson forbade his drivers from discussing money matters, including raises, with him). After signing, Hendrick formed a third team for Waltrip, carrying the No. 17 and sponsored by Tide.

In 1987, his first year with Hendrick Motorsports, Waltrip had limited success, compared to his previous years with Johnson. He won only one race (at the Goody's 500) and had six Top 5 finishes. In 1988, he won two races, including his fourth Coca-Cola 600 win.

In the first race of 1989, the Daytona 500, Waltrip won the race for the first time in his 17th attempt with a fuel conservation strategy along with his long-time crew-chief Jeff Hammond, making his final pit stop for fuel a distant 53 laps (132 miles) from the finish. Most of the other cars could run no more than 45 or 46 laps on a tank of fuel, so that meant Waltrip would need to feather the throttle and "draft" off other cars in order to save enough fuel to make it to the finish without an additional pit stop. Hammond, interviewed by television pit reporters during the final stint of the race, said that his strategy was for Waltrip to "draft off anybody, and everybody", to save fuel. Even though Waltrip's car ran much slower than other cars in the last 53 laps, he was able to avoid making the additional pit stop for fuel that the other cars had to make. The strategy provided Waltrip with the track position needed to win the race. His post-race interview with CBS pit reporter Mike Joy, became famous, with Waltrip shouting "I won the Daytona 500! I won the Daytona 500! Wait, this is the Daytona 500 ain't it? ...Thank God!", accompanied by the "Ickey Shuffle" dance in Victory Lane. Later, after the Daytona 500 win, Waltrip visited president George H. W. Bush at the white House in Washington, D.C.

Waltrip's popularity as a driver would come full circle on the evening of The Winston, an all-star racing event held May 21, 1989, (an event that did not award points toward the NASCAR national championship), at Charlotte Motor Speedway. With two laps to go, Waltrip was leading the race and poised to win when Rusty Wallace hit his car exiting the 4th turn, sending him into the infield and costing him the victory and the $200,000 purse. Not only was Waltrip and his crew upset at being knocked out of the victory, the 150,000 fans watching the race issued boos to Wallace, the winner. The two crews scuffled in the pits and harsh words were said after the race. Waltrip was quoted after the race as saying "I hope he chokes on it", referring to the $200,000 that Wallace collected for the victory. Waltrip's car was clearly superior to that of Wallace and, had it not been for the contact initiated by Wallace on the final lap, Waltrip would have won the all-star event. During the 1989, and 1990 seasons, Waltrip was voted NASCAR's Most Popular Driver by fans.

Waltrip would win six races in 1989, his best year with Hendrick Motorsports, and helped develop NASCAR's version of the new Chevrolet Lumina in 1989, and delivered its first victory by winning a historic and unprecedented fifth Coca-Cola 600 that May. Besides establishing a race record for victories, the win prepared him for a chance to win the one remaining "major race" which had eluded him since his first race at the Heinz Southern 500 at Darlington. A Darlington victory would award him a one million dollar bonus for winning three of the sport's four majors in the same season, the Daytona 500, the Winston 500, Coca-Cola 600, and the Mountain Dew Southern 500. The pressure of both the million dollar bonus and Career Grand Slam adversely affected Waltrip. He made contact with the wall early in the 1989 Southern 500 and was never a contender for winning the race, and the million dollar bonus.

For many reasons, Waltrip was unable to carry his success of the previous year into 1990. Waltrip failed to visit victory lane all season although he finished 2nd in a controversial finish in the season's 7th race, the First Union 400, at North Wilkesboro Speedway. Brett Bodine had led 63 laps in the middle of the race and then re-took the lead on lap 318 after short pitting on a round of green flag pit stops.  When the caution came out on lap 321, the pace car mistakenly picked up Dale Earnhardt as the race leader, putting Brett almost a full lap in front of the entire field. During the ensuing confusion of a 17 lap caution flag (NASCAR did not have electronic scoring at the time) Bodine was able to make a pit stop for fresh tires without losing any positions. When NASCAR reset the lineup with Bodine as the leader, he led the final 83 laps of the race (a race-high 146 laps overall) to take the victory.  

"We messed up," said Chip Williams, NASCAR's public relations director. "By throwing the caution on the second-place car, it kept Bodine in the lead. He slipped into the pits and came out without losing the lead because the pace car was keeping the second-place car back. We messed up by picking up the wrong car. It was a judgment call." Waltrip filed a protest post-race, only to be denied on the grounds that judgment calls were not subject to protest/appeal. 1990 was the first year since 1974, that Waltrip did not win a race and Waltrip still remains irked to this very day over the result. Waltrip only visited victory lane five more times and never won again after 1992.

While practicing for his 500th career NASCAR start in the Pepsi 400, at Daytona, Waltrip's car spun in oil laid down by another car experiencing engine failure, and was hit by an oncoming car driven by Dave Marcis. Waltrip suffered a broken arm, a broken leg, and a concussion. He missed the Pepsi 400, but came back to run one lap at Pocono, before giving way to Jimmy Horton as a relief driver. (A driver who starts, and completes one lap, is credited the NASCAR points regardless of who is driving the car at the finish). Despite missing the next five races due to his injuries, Waltrip finished 20th in driver points and the team finished 5th in owner points with substitute drivers taking turns in the car.

Owner-driver years: 1991–mid-1998

After his fourth season as a driver for Hendrick Motorsports, Waltrip formed his own team to field cars in the 1991 NASCAR Winston Cup Series (Winston Cup) season. Driving his own cars had been his passion since he successfully drove his own cars in his early NASCAR career in the early and mid-1970s. He would continue his relationship with Chevrolet and drive a Chevrolet Lumina with Western Auto as the primary team sponsor. Waltrip purchased team assets, including the racing facilities, from his former owner Rick Hendrick in Charlotte, North Carolina, and hired long-time friend and crew chief, Jeff Hammond, to oversee the building of race cars and to continue as crew chief. Waltrip and Hammond enjoyed much success together as Hammond had been with Waltrip during the championship-winning years with Junior Johnson, and most of the Hendrick Motorsports years, and was Waltrip's crew chief for his 1989 Daytona 500 win and 3 of his 5 Coca-Cola 600 wins.

In the 1991 season, Waltrip visited victory lane twice, his first win in his second stint as owner-driver coming in only the 7th race of the season on April 21, 1991, in the First Union 400, at North Wilkesboro Speedway in North Wilkesboro, North Carolina. His second win of the year came in the 13th race of the season on June 16, 1991, in the Champion Spark Plug 500, at Pocono Raceway, in Long Pond, Pennsylvania.

Just two races after celebrating his second win of 1991, Waltrip would again be involved in another serious crash, again at the Daytona International Speedway, in Daytona Beach, Florida. It came after completing the 119th of 160 laps on the 2.5-mile superspeedway. Waltrip and driver Alan Kulwicki were racing side by side, leading a large grouping of cars, battling for 5th position. The car drafting Alan Kulwicki bumped the Kulwicki car, causing his car to hit Waltrip's Western Auto Chevrolet at speeds approaching 200 mph on the long backstretch. Waltrip's car slowed and was collected by driver Joe Ruttman's car, both cars sliding sideways several hundred feet on the grassy infield. The tires of Waltrip's car clipped the edge of an access road causing it to become airborne and tumbling end over end several times before coming to a stop, upside-down, in a grassy area near turn 3. Waltrip was extricated and only suffered minor injuries but many feared that he could have re-injured his shattered leg from the crash at the same track the previous year. (Slow-motion video and still photography showed that Waltrip's left arm was outside the car as the car tumbled, and came to rest.) Waltrip still had a plate in his left leg from the compound fractures he suffered in the earlier crash at the Pepsi 400, at the Daytona International Speedway, (Waltrip commented on  January 10, 2013, SPEED Television broadcast of the Daytona NASCAR winter testing, that he had spent more time in the hospital from injuries suffered at the Daytona Speedway, than at any other track he had raced). Waltrip would compete in the following race, the summer race at the Pocono Raceway, in Long Pond, Pennsylvania, but was crashed again when driver Ernie Irvan spun driver Hut Stricklin, in front of almost the entire field. Waltrip won the year's spring race at the track just 5 weeks before.

Waltrip finished the first year of his second stint as owner-driver 8th in the overall Winston Cup points championship, after being as high as 3rd place after 14 races. His first year was generally viewed as a successful first year outing. However, Waltrip was now 44 years old, had children, and had many pressures as owner/driver that he did not concern himself with driving for multimillion-dollar, highly financed race teams, such as Hendrick Motorsports.

In 1992, Waltrip collected three more wins, including the Mountain Dew Southern 500, a race held at Darlington Raceway in Darlington, South Carolina, United States, September 6, 1992, (the last major race which had eluded his 20-year career), and finished 9th in points, after being as high as 6th after 22 races. That would be Waltrip's 84th, and final NASCAR career victory, tying him with Bobby Allison for what was then third on the all-time list, behind Richard Petty, with 200 wins, and David Pearson, with 105 wins. Both he and Allison have since been passed by Jeff Gordon, who has 93 wins by the time he retired at the end of the 2015 season.

In 1993, Waltrip signed former Richard Childress Racing engine builder Lou LaRosa, to build engines, and Barry Dodson, a former championship-winning crew chief. He posted four top-ten finishes but did not finish higher than third. 1994 saw him make his final appearance in the top ten in championship points by finishing 9th. He had a then-unprecedented streak over two seasons, of 40 races, without a DNF, all with in-house engines. His only engine failure in the season was after the car crossed the finish line. Waltrip finished 19th in points in 1995 when he crashed at The Winston and was forced to let relief drivers take over for several weeks. His second half of the season was highlighted by his final career pole position at the NAPA 500.

In 1996, Waltrip posted two top-ten finishes. Western Auto remained the sponsor as part of Waltrip's 25th-anniversary celebration. While the year was one of Waltrip's most profitable, his results continued to fall off.

At the 1997 UAW-GM Quality 500, Waltrip failed to qualify for the first time in over 20 years as Terry Labonte also failed to make the race. Because Labonte was a more recent Cup champion (in fact, he was the defending Cup champion that season), he was able to take the past champion's provisional. Waltrip, who was 20th in owner points, was too low in the owner points position to make the race (only the top four in owner points of cars not in the field, excluding the most recent former champion not in the field, were added after qualifying under 1997 rules). After the season, Waltrip and his team were struggling to find sponsors but were able to put together a last-minute deal with the Ohio-based company Speedblock for 1998. Speedblock only paid portions of what was promised, and the deal was canceled. Waltrip's team at this point was nearly insolvent, and he sold the team to Tim Beverly. Waltrip's final race as an owner-driver was at the TranSouth Financial 400, and was originally post-drive a sponsorless car, but instead decided to drive a "Tim Flock Special" as the former 2-time Grand National Series champion was fighting liver and throat cancer and was without medical insurance, and Waltrip wanted to help raise money for Flock and his family by having a trust fund with NASCAR's 50th Anniversary. Flock died at age 73 just nine days after the race.  In 2008, Waltrip admitted the reason that he failed as a driver-owner team was because he thought like a driver, not as an owner.

1998 mid season with Dale Earnhardt, Inc.

Beverly chose not to race the team immediately, instead choosing to rebuild the team (now part of Dale Earnhardt, Inc. after two sales and a merger). During this time, Waltrip signed with Dale Earnhardt, Inc. to drive the No. 1 Pennzoil Chevy, filling in for injured rookie Steve Park. During his tenure with DEI, Waltrip posted a fifth-place finish at the California 500, and led in the final stages of the Pocono 500, and finished sixth.

Final years of racing: 1998–2000

At the 1998 Brickyard 400, Beverly returned Waltrip's former team as the No. 35 Chevrolet Monte Carlo with Tabasco sponsorship with Waltrip driving. A sponsorship conflict with Tabasco would switch the team to the Pontiac Grand Prix. Waltrip resigned at the end of the season, citing performance issues. After a brief flirtation with retirement, Waltrip signed to drive the No. 66 Big K Ford Taurus for Haas-Carter Motorsports, with teammate Jimmy Spencer. Waltrip failed to qualify seven times during that season with a new qualifying rule for the Past Champion's Provisional.  On August 5, 1999, Waltrip announced during the practice session for the Brickyard 400 that he would retire from NASCAR at the end of the 2000 season following a farewell tour.

During his retirement year of 2000, Waltrip's best run came at the Brickyard 400, where he qualified on the outside pole and finished eleventh. His final race came on November 20, 2000, in the NAPA 500, at Atlanta Motor Speedway, where he posted a 34th-place finish in the Haas-Carter Motorsports owned No. 66 Route 66 Big K Ford Taurus. He finished 36th in points that season and failed to qualify six times.

Craftsman Truck Series

In 1995, Waltrip built a Craftsman Truck Series team, and found success by 1997, when Rich Bickle finished second in overall season standings, winning three races, and made Waltrip one of the few car owners to have won races in NASCAR's three national series. When Sears ceased sponsorship of the team in 1997, Waltrip suspended his truck team, not returning until 2004, when he re-entered the series as an owner and part of Toyota NASCAR development program.

Broadcast career: 2001–2019
Prior to retiring from racing, Waltrip provided commentary on several IROC broadcasts for ABC. Also, from 1994 to 1998, on weekends that Winston Cup was not competing, had provided commentary on many NASCAR Busch Series (one level below Winston Cup) races broadcasts on TNN, teaming with Mike Joy. In 2001, after his final 2000 season as a NASCAR driver, Waltrip signed with Fox, to be lead NASCAR Winston Cup Series (Winston Cup) analyst and race commentator on the network's NASCAR telecasts, teaming with Mike Joy and Larry McReynolds.

Inaugural broadcasts and safety advocate
Waltrip began his career with Fox at the 2001 Daytona 500. His younger brother, Michael Waltrip, won the race, but Michael's victory was overshadowed by the death of Dale Earnhardt. On the final scheduled lap, Earnhardt's car made contact with Sterling Marlin, as the black No. 3 drifted low on the track, probably attempting a blocking maneuver so that either Michael Waltrip or Dale Earnhardt Jr.driving for Dale Sr.'s DEI, although he himself drove for RCRwould win the race. After contacting the Marlin car, Earnhardt's car suddenly veered right and slammed hard head-on into the retaining wall in turn four. Earnhardt's car came to rest in the infield as Michael Waltrip won the race, with Darrell Waltrip shouting for joy as he called the final run to the checkered flag. His joy at his brother's victory soon gave way to concern for Earnhardt as he watched replays of the crash.

Waltrip and Earnhardt had been bitter rivals on the track in the 1980s but as the years passed, the rivalry and bitterness had given way to a deep respect and close friendship. After the race, Waltrip was taken from the Fox Broadcast booth to the Halifax Medical Center to meet with the Earnhardt family and his brother Michael. Waltrip later gave the invocation at the Earnhardt funeral. and gave the invocation at the following week's race praying for Earnhardt and the promise of moving on from the tragedy.

At the following week's race, Waltrip interviewed NASCAR President Mike Helton for a pre-race segment during the broadcast. This was before NASCAR mandated the use of the HANS device to reduce the risk of catastrophic head and neck injuries, and the "SAFER" (Steel and Foam Energy Reduction) barriers used at all NASCAR tracks today. Waltrip believed that four deaths in the previous ten months, all caused by basilar skull fractures incurred in accidents, were too many, and was not shy about asking Helton for an explanation. Helton's responses irritated Waltrip, who was noted by one magazine for "acting a lot more like the next Mike Wallace (of 60 Minutes) than the next John Madden". Waltrip delivered the pre-race invocation for the race in honor of Earnhardt.

As a long-time advocate for motorsports safety, Waltrip then pushed for mandatory head-and-neck restraints, and two weeks later, demonstrated the device during the broadcast at Atlanta Motor Speedway, explaining the benefits and how the device worked. Seven months later, NASCAR mandated the devices after a crash during an ARCA Re/Max Series race, held after qualifying for the UAW-GM Quality 500, killed driver Blaise Alexander.

Broadcast style
As the cars take the green flag to start each race, Waltrip shouts "Boogity, boogity, boogity, let's go racing boys and girls!" This somewhat nonsensical phrase has become Waltrip's trademark in recent years. (The phrase "boogity, boogity, boogity" also appears in the 1960 doo wop parody "Who Put the Bomp" by Barry Mann.) Humble Pie used the shorter phrase "boogity-boogity" in their 1970 song "Red Light Mama, Red Hot". Ray Stevens used the phrase throughout his 1974 hit, "The Streak". Jerry Reed also said this phrase in the 1977 movie "Smokey and the Bandit." Waltrip was featured on a 1992 home video from Ray Stevens entitled the Amazing Rolling Revue. In this home video Waltrip played the part of the out of control driver of the tour bus/rolling venue. Waltrip explained that the catchphrase arose because, as a driver, he grew tired of hearing his spotter or crew chief say "green, green, green" at the start of every race and wanted to hear something more original. The catchphrase had always been preceded by fellow analyst and former crew chief Larry McReynolds telling Waltrip to "reach up there and pull those belts tight one more time!" until recent years, when McReynolds used the phrase less and less and eventually phased it out altogether.

In 2011, Waltrip stated that his favorite race to have broadcast thus far was the 2010 Aaron's 499. The race lead was exchanged many times among many different drivers rather than the lead being dominated by a single driver. The race ended with driver Kevin Harvick beating driver Jamie McMurray for the win by only the length of a bumper.

Waltrip also lends his unique verbiage to his commentary, speaking of "coop-petetion" when racers work together, but keep each other under a watchful eye, "s'perince" when talking about driving skills of a veteran driver, and "using the chrome horn", when a driver somewhat purposefully bumps a car that's in the way (bumpers on cars used to be made of metal and coated in chrome). In early 2007, Waltrip was nominated for an Emmy in the category "Outstanding Event Analyst".

In March 2011, FOX awarded Waltrip a 2-year contract extension, taking him through 2014, the same year the network's NASCAR contract ends (although the broadcast contract has been extended to 2024).

In October 2011, Waltrip, Joy, Calvin Fish and Australian Leigh Diffey traveled to Australia to host Speed's coverage of the Supercheap Auto Bathurst 1000 race held at the famous Mount Panorama Circuit. Since Waltrip had not hosted in Australia before, he counted on Australian NASCAR driver Marcos Ambrose to help him learn about the country. During the trip, in regards to hosting, Waltrip and Joy are most famous for helping Ambrose reconcile with a former Bathurst rival Greg Murphy, known for an infamous Lap 145 dustup at the 2005 event following a restart that led to a famous squabble. The interview took place during a safety car session after Murphy had exited the car during a driver change. In the days leading up to the race, Waltrip was taken on a few laps of the track by Supercars Championship driver Jason Bright in Bright's Brad Jones Racing Holden VE Commodore, describing the 6.213 km (3.861 mi) long mountain circuit as a "Geological oddity".

Waltrip announced his retirement from broadcasting on April 4, 2019, at Bristol Motor Speedway citing his desire to spend more time with his wife and grandchildren. His final race in the broadcast booth was the 2019 Toyota/Save Mart 350 at Sonoma Raceway.

Post-Cup Series retirement
Waltrip fielded a Toyota sponsored by Japanese industrial giant NTN for his Craftsman Truck Series team in 2004. David Reutimann drove the truck for the team and earned Rookie of the Year honors that year. Waltrip's team expanded to two trucks in 2005. In August 2005, the revived Darrell Waltrip Motorsports won its first race, the Toyota Tundra 200 at Nashville Superspeedway with Reutimann driving. During the 2007 season, A.J. Allmendinger drove the No. 00 Red Bull Toyota but with minimal success. By years end the team was sold to The Racer's Group, a road racing operation.

Waltrip has made occasional starts (three or less each year) in the Craftsman Truck Series and Busch Series since his "retirement" in 2000. Each of these races have been either at Martinsville Speedway or Indianapolis Raceway Park.

Waltrip was the honorary starter at the 2007 Food City 500 and was also the honorary starter for the 2008 Gatorade Duel as Gatorade was one of Waltrip's former sponsors. He also started/completed a Busch Series race at Martinsville in his brother's "Aaron's Dream Machine" after appearing in ads in 2003–2005 begging his brother to let him drive the Aaron's Dream Machine.

In 2009, he appeared in commercials for Rejuvenate Auto with his No. 11 Mountain Dew Chevrolet. Waltrip also appeared in Fox public service announcements for breast cancer awareness.

In 2010 and 2011, Waltrip voiced his support for saving the old Nashville Fairgrounds Speedway, now known as simply the Fairgrounds Speedway, in Nashville. The speedway was first opened in 1904, and hosted a weekly racing series for decades. It is the track where Waltrip first had success at weekly racing events in the 1960s and 70s, winning two track championships and where his first NASCAR victory came May 10, 1975. Some residents living close to the speedway have complained of noise and many local politicians have proposed closing the speedway and developing the property.

Waltrip retired as a race commentator for Fox at the end of the 2019 racing season. In March 2011, FOX announced that Waltrip would continue as their lead NASCAR analyst and race commentator through 2014. In May 2015, FOX announced that Jeff Gordon would join him and Mike Joy starting in 2016, replacing their long-time broadcast partner Larry McReynolds.

In 2017, Waltrip announced on his Twitter page that he had undergone a knee replacement from an injury that occurred during the 1991 Pepsi 400. This was also mentioned in his Facebook account.

Waltrip currently owns Honda, Volvo, Subaru, and Buick/GMC automobile dealerships in Franklin, Tennessee, in partnership with his former team owner Rick Hendrick.

Legacy
Waltrip is considered by most in the racing community as a true ambassador to the sport of motor racing. He is a passionate promoter of all forms of racing, especially American stock car auto racing.

Waltrip is recognized by many who closely follow motorsports as NASCAR's first "total package" driver. He was media savvy, articulate, attractive and possessed the driving skills that would take him to the pinnacle of the sport. His style attracted big-budget sponsors that are necessary to fund the multimillion-dollar NASCAR teams. Today, it is customary for the team's sponsor to have considerable input into who the team's driver will be that represents their brand or product on the track. Today's NASCAR driver fits the mold that Waltrip first ushered into NASCAR in the 1970s.

As a Fox Sports analyst and broadcaster, Waltrip's opinions, views and comments carry considerable weight with drivers, team owners, fans and NASCAR heads. Waltrip has never been shy about expressing his views, even if controversial.

Waltrip has been a design consultant on some of the newer tracks including the Kentucky Motor Speedway, and the Nashville Superspeedway.

Waltrip has a building which holds many of the race cars he drove throughout his career.

He was inducted into the Motorsports Hall of Fame of America in 2003.

On June 14, 2011, he was selected to the NASCAR Hall of Fame Class of 2012.

Waltrip officially won 84 NASCAR cup races, but yet another, additional, and uncounted "win" was as relief driver for Donnie Allison, at the 1977 Talladega 500. (Allison received credit for the win because he was driving the car when the race started). In that race, Waltrip retired after 106, of 188, laps. Allison sought a relief driver for his No. 1 Hawaiian Tropic sponsored Chevrolet, due to the excess heat of the day, and Waltrip was asked to complete the race in Allison's car. The irony was that Waltrip replaced Allison at the DiGard No. 88 race team just two years previously, which was part of the long lore of the "Allisons vs Waltrip" battle that lasted for more than 16 years.

His 84 wins in the Cup series are tied for fourth place in NASCAR history, with Bobby Allison. In 2011, Jeff Gordon scored his 85th career victory surpassing Waltrip for most wins in the "modern era" of NASCAR. (NASCAR's "modern era" takes into account current scheduling, and the elimination of dirt tracks from scoring statistics; several of Allison's wins came before the start of the "modern era").

Media appearances

Film and television
Waltrip's entertainment appearances were influenced by his early 1970s work with Ralph Emery in Nashville radio and television, and that led to his work as a fill-in for Emery.

In the 1980s and 1990s, he would substitute for Emery on The Nashville Network's Nashville Now and later hosted himself the network's two successor variety shows, "Music City Tonight" and "Prime Time Country".

Waltrip worked on Days of Thunder as Hendrick Motorsports was a major provider of cars and drivers (he helped hire Bobby Hamilton for the project), and one of his injury substitutes was lead stunt driver Greg Sacks.

Waltrip has twice been a presenter at the GMA (Gospel Music Association) Music Awards, partnering with Kathy Troccoli both times. In 1999, they presented the "Song of the Year" award to Mitch McVicker and Rich Mullins for "My Deliverer". Rich Mullins and Mitch McVicker were thrown from their truck after not wearing seat belts, and Mullins was killed in the accident.

In 2006, Waltrip and Nicole C. Mullen hosted a DirecTV special, Songs of Faith. He provided the voice of Darrell Cartrip, an anthropomorphic car version of himself in all 3 movies of Pixar's Cars franchise. He also appeared in the broadcast booth in the films Talladega Nights: The Ballad of Ricky Bobby, where his phrase was "in racing you have good days and bad days and Ricky Bobby just had himself a bad day". On December 15, 2006, Waltrip played the role of Mother Ginger in the Nashville Ballet's production of The Nutcracker.

He appeared in advertisements for Toyota and Aaron's alongside his brother, Michael, where his gimmick was constantly asking Michael's permission to drive the Aaron's Dream Machine (a nickname for the No. 99 Nationwide Series car). Waltrip has also made a number of appearances in "comedic" segments appearing during his actual Fox broadcasts.

He was featured in two NASCAR Series videos Darrell Waltrip: Quicksilver which explained Waltrip's career and future and he appeared in the NASCAR Video series where he teaches helpful driving tips for driving on the freeway and long-distance drives.

In February, 2011, Waltrip appeared in The Day which was a one-hour documentary about the tragic death of Dale Earnhardt at the 2001 Daytona 500.

Waltrip initially believed accidents would happen to him.  He was featured in a video testimonial on IamSecond.com talking about his Christian faith in Jesus Christ in which he discussed the meaninglessness of the rest of his career, compared to that relationship.

Waltrip, along with fellow commentators Mike Joy and Jeff Gordon, made a cameo appearance as themselves in the 2017 heist comedy film Logan Lucky.

Books and magazines
Waltrip has also been successful in the publishing field. In September 1994, he was featured as the cover story in Guideposts.

His autobiography, DW: A Lifetime Going Around in Circles, was a New York Times best-seller when it was released around the 2004 Daytona 500. The book was co-written with Jade Gurss.

In May 2004, Waltrip became the second sports figure to be featured in former NBA player and basketball coach Jay Carty's One-on-One series of devotional books. Darrell Waltrip One-on-One: The Faith that Took Him to the Finish Line is a sixty-day devotional book featuring Waltrip's stories and how they can relate to Christian faith, and Carty's devotionals.

Motorsports career results

NASCAR
(key) (Bold – Pole position awarded by qualifying time. Italics – Pole position earned by points standings or practice time. * – Most laps led.)

Winston Cup Series

Daytona 500

Busch Series

Craftsman Truck Series

International Race of Champions
(key) (Bold – Pole position. * – Most laps led.)

See also
 Michael Waltrip
 Darrell Waltrip Motorsports

References

External links

 
 
 
 Career Stats – NASCAR.com
 Darrell Waltrip Honda

 
Living people
1947 births
Sportspeople from Owensboro, Kentucky
Motorsport announcers
Racing drivers from Kentucky
Racing drivers from Owensboro, Kentucky
NASCAR drivers
NASCAR Cup Series champions
International Race of Champions drivers
American Speed Association drivers
NASCAR team owners
International Motorsports Hall of Fame inductees
American Christians
People from Franklin, Tennessee
Racing drivers from Tennessee
American television sports announcers
Hendrick Motorsports drivers
Dale Earnhardt Inc. drivers
USAC Stock Car drivers
NASCAR Hall of Fame inductees
Michael Waltrip Racing drivers